How to Undress in Public Without Undue Embarrassment is a 1965 short comedy feature from Britain starring Jon Pertwee, Christine Child, Zelma Malik, Reginald Beckwith, and Kenneth Connor, with narration by Fenella Fielding and John Deacon. The film was scripted and directed by Compton Bennett. It was the last film that he worked on.

References

External links
Film page at IMDb
Film page at BFI

1965 films
British short films